Perymeniopsis is a genus of flowering plants in the family Asteraceae.

There is only one known species, Perymeniopsis ovalifolia, native to Mexico (Oaxaca, Veracruz, Tamaulipas, San Luis Potosí).

References

Endemic flora of Mexico
Monotypic Asteraceae genera
Heliantheae